In Colorado, State Highway 34 may refer to:
U.S. Route 34 in Colorado, the only Colorado highway numbered 34 since 1968
Colorado State Highway 34 (1938-1953) north of Fort Morgan